Yahya Birt is a British-American writer and academic. Holding an Oxford University M.Phil. in Social and Cultural Anthropology and described by The Economist in 2014 as "an influential British Muslim", he was as of 2017 a doctoral candidate at Leeds University in the UK. He is the son of John Birt, former Director-General of the BBC. A convert to Islam, his academic research is focused on contemporary Islam in general, and British Islam in particular; he has worked on Abdullah Quilliam. Birt's commentary has been cited in a number of newspapers, including the Guardian, the Economist, the Intercept, and The Muslim News. Birt is a liberal Muslim

Works
In addition to academic research articles on Islam in Britain, Birt has written or co-edited the following books.
 British Secularism and Religion (2016)
 Islam in Victorian Liverpool (2021)
 The Collected Poems of Abdullah Quilliam (2021)
 Pandemic Pilgrimage: Poems from Bradford to Makkah and Medina (2022)

References 

Year of birth missing (living people)
Living people
Academics of the University of Leeds
British Muslims
Converts to Islam